This is a list of electoral results for the Electoral district of Boulder in Western Australian state elections.

Members for Boulder

Election results

Elections in the 1970s

Elections in the 1960s

 Two party preferred vote is estimated.

Elections in the 1950s

Elections in the 1940s

 A two-party-preferred calculation was not made.

Elections in the 1930s

 Preferences were not distributed.

Elections in the 1920s

Elections in the 1910s

 Collier won Boulder unopposed at the 1914 election.

Elections in the 1900s

References

Western Australian state electoral results by district